Jacob Anthony Perez (born April 21, 1996), known professionally as Princeton Perez, is an American singer-songwriter, professional dancer, and actor. Born and raised in Downey, California, near Los Angeles, Perez began his career at a young age when he appeared in television advertisements for companies such as Nike, McDonald's, and Skechers.

He was included in two Gym Class Heroes music videos, including "Shoot Down the Stars" (as a young school child), and "Cupid's Chokehold" (as Cupid Boy). Perez rose to fame as a member of the boy band Mindless Behavior, in which he remained from 2008 until the group's disbandment in 2017.

Life and career

2006–2008: Early life and career beginnings
In 2006, Perez was cast in two Gym Class Heroes music videos. "Shoot Down the Stars" followed him as a younger version of Travie McCoy, being bullied by other students. The video ends in various children, including Princeton, dancing in a school talent show and on the school's playground. "Cupid's Chokehold", however portrayed him as a young Cupid, shooting Travie with a bow and arrow, causing Travie to express his love for various women in the video. He was also featured on the album art for the single. In an interview with AwesomenessTV, Princeton has said that he had also danced backup for Nicole Scherzinger.

At the age of 11, Princeton appeared on commercials for Skechers, McDonald's and Nike, which helped progress his career in entertainment. He was also cast in High School Musical 3, playing a small part as the young Corbin Bleu, but he could not take the role as it was around the same time he became a member of Mindless Behavior. Princeton had worked with choreographers such as Dave Scott and Kaelynn Harris, from 8 Flavahz. He has also taken dance classes at Debbie Allen Dance Academy with other dancers, such as the dancer and actress, Zoë Soul.

2008–13: #1 Girl and All Around the World
Lakeisha Gamble, one of the contributing founders of Mindless Behavior, convinced future producer of the group, Walter Millsap, to form an American boy band. He was opposed to the idea at first, as explained in the film, Mindless Behavior: All Around the World. Along with Gamble and Millsap, there was Streamline Records head Vincent Herbert, who agreed on the concept of forming a boy band. Following the idea of forming the group, Gamble, Millsap, Herbert, songwriter Candice Nelson, and choreographer David Scott held open auditions in California in an attempt to find local boys that would fit the criteria of the group. Dave Scott, a choreographer who had previously worked with Princeton at Debbie Allen Academy, had been recommended to contact him for an audition. Gamble had seen him in a Gym Class Heroes video, "Cupid's Chokehold", portraying a young Cupid. Princeton had been called in to audition, and stated that he was "nervous" that he wouldn't get the part, as he did with every audition. Upon finishing the audition, he was told that he would hear back from them in two weeks, however, he got an approval the same night.

Joining soon afterwards Princeton was Prodigy (Craig Crippen, Jr.), Roc Royal (Chresanto August), and Ray Ray (Rayan Lopez). Perez was named after Princeton University, due to his extensive knowledge in various music genres. For the next two years, they immersed themselves in music, developing their musical sound and style under the guidance of Herbert and Millsap. They moved in with their manager, Gamble, and began frequently rehearing dance routines, changing their diets, and getting to know one another. Teresa Perez, Princeton's mother, described it as a "boot camp" for each of the boys. Gaining their performance repertoire, they put on shows at local schools on the CLASSCFIED High School Tour. This helped them gain fans and recognition, along with their YouTube channel that held their creative "MB Cam" and Ustream account. Soon afterwards, Interscope Records chairman Jimmy Iovine signed Mindless Behavior to the label.

Before headlining their own tours, Mindless Behavior toured with many established musicians, such as The Backstreet Boys, Jason Derulo, Justin Bieber, and was an opening act for Janet Jackson during her Number Ones, Up Close and Personal tour. The group had become quite popular from appearing on BET's 106 & Park, and also headlined the first BET Closer to My Dreams Tour alongside Diggy Simmons, Lil Twist, Trevante and Jawan Harris. In 2011, Mindless Behavior headlined the Scream Tour with Diggy Simmons, which featured The OMG Girlz, Jacob Latimore, and Hamilton Park. The group also performed at the White House twice, and were the first African American boy band to do so. Also in 2011, they performed at the prestigious White House Easter Egg Roll. In 2012, they were performers at Arthur Ashe Kids' Day. In 2013, the group performed for Wade's World Foundation, an organization by Dwyane Wade that provides support to community-based organizations that promote education, health and social skills for children in at-risk situations. They were also welcomed back to the White House to perform at the Kids Inaugural Ball.

In July 2012, the group headlined their largest U.S. tour. The tour held the same name as their debut album. The No. 1 Girl Tour held opening acts from artists Jacob Latimore, Lil Twist, and Kayla Brianna. While on tour, the group visited the Ronald McDonald House in Georgia to cheer up some of the young patients who were battling cancer. In 2013, the group embarked on their All Around The World Tour. Since joining Mindless Behavior, Princeton, along with former bandmates Roc Royal, Ray Ray and Prodigy, have released two albums, performed on tour, and sold over 327,000 album copies in the United States. Later within the year, many news sources announced that there would be a new member after the group's lead singer, Craig Crippen Jr., who known as Prodigy, had left the group. After lead singer Prodigy left the group, Mindless Behavior did not release any material. As seen in many interviews, there had only been Princeton, Roc Royal, and Ray Ray, which meant that there hadn't been a lead singer introduced. For almost two years, Mindless Behavior participated in interviews, and even held shows for their fans, without a lead singer. However, many of these shows included nothing but the band performing dance routines, while Prodigy's voice played in the background. Elijah Johnson replaced him as the lead singer in April 2014.

2014–16: Group changes and #OfficialMBMusic
Princeton expressed a strong interest in fashion while in the group. When entertaining the idea of not being a member of Mindless Behavior, he spoke about being either a backup dancer for another artist, or a fashion designer, stating "Anything creative and entertaining, I'll be there." He exclaimed his style as more androgynous, with a mixture of punk meeting urban. His musical influences of Prince, Michael Jackson, and a compilation of many rock bands, heavily influenced his style and mannerisms. Outside of Mindless Behavior, he participated as a judge in the "Face of Spoiled Show & Contest" with Eva Marcille in July 2014.

Following this hiatus, Mindless Behavior were removed from Interscope's roster, and signed a deal with Epic Records. The hiatus of Mindless Behavior following Prodigy's departure led Princeton into his own artistic creations. He would post on his blog, Outsiders Ink, photos or videos of himself in ways that his fans had not seen before. He posted a short film, reciting a poem that he wrote on his blog as well. In an interview that featured the group in January 2015, both Princeton and Lopez stated they had been working on projects outside of the group that included music and fashion. "Don't Believe in Love", a reggae fusion-pop inspired track, was his first solo record that he released on his SoundCloud account. The song has since reached over 750,000 listens as of January 2018.

By the release of their second album, Mindless Behavior had undergone many group member changes. Chresanto August, known as Roc Royal, was removed from the group and later pursued a solo musical career. Management replaced him with vocalist Mike River, who remained in the group until the announcement of their disbandment in 2017. The group then began working on their third studio album titled Recharge, which was to be released in 2015, but was shelved. Soon after, Rayan Lopez, known as Ray Ray, left the group as well. Princeton was the only original member of the group that was formed in 2008. After disposing of the #Recharge album, they began working on their third album together, "#OfficialMBMusic", which was released in 2016.

After the album release, the group began shooting a drama film directed by Carl Payne, titled Misguided Behavior. The film stars Carl Payne, Clifton Powell, Towanda Braxton, Khalil Kain and Mindless Behavior and was set to be released April 11, 2017. Mindless Behavior announced their "#NoParentsAllowed" tour in September 2016. The 23-city tour was said to be sponsored by Alcatel in support of their latest studio album, #OfficialMBMusic. The tour was expected to start November 9, in Greensboro, North Carolina, and end December 17 in Philadelphia, Pennsylvania. However, in November 2016, it was announced by each group member that the tour had been postponed, many ticket websites showcasing the entire tour as cancelled. In a YouNow, Princeton explained that the group does not control tour dates, and had been trying to schedule dates since earlier that year.

2017–present: Solo career and Papi Chulo Prelude
In January 2017, Princeton spoke to a fan in his Instagram comments, regarding the hiatus situation with the group. He insinuated that the music industry is a "machine", and that if "certain managers" and record labels allowed Mindless Behavior to own the right to both their music and group name, that they would be allowed to create more music. Prior to this incident, there were many rumors circulating that Mindless Behavior had disbanded, but that was quickly proved to be false by bandmate Mike River.

In February, Princeton publicly announced the disbandment of Mindless Behavior via Twitter. This was due to the group not receiving the rights for their music, and wanting to do their own things outside of the group. He has not stated a release date for any of his own musical projects. Princeton posted a photo on his Instagram of him and Taylor Bennett in the studio, and the track list for Bennett's project, Restoration of An American Idol, was released February 23, with Princeton featured in the intro track "The Kid's Alright".

In March, Perez cut his hair, which is something that he never imagined doing while in Mindless Behavior. He appeared on the cover of 360 Magazine, making it his first solo magazine cover following the disbandment of Mindless Behavior. In April, a day before his twenty-first birthday, he covered Obvious Magazine. He covered Tinsley Magazine in June.

Perez was a guest at the Las Vegas Teen Town Hall alongside former Mindless Behavior group member Elijah Johnson and Diamond White. City Councilman Ricki Y. Barlow hosted the event, which was accompanied by ten various high schools within the district, including that of Legacy High School, Rancho High School, Canyon Springs High School, West Preparatory Academy, Valley High School, Veterans Tribute Career & Technical Academy, Cheyenne High School, Western High, Advanced Technologies Academy, and West Career and Technical Academy. The topics presented were bullying and racial discrimination, with a focus on improving the local school district. Presented by Barlow, the city of Las Vegas awarded and recognized each guest by granting May 30 as Diamond White, Elijah "EJ" Johnson, and Jacob "Princeton" Perez Day.

During the BET Experience prior to the BET Awards 2017, Perez hosted the Teen Summit panel, which had been removed from syndication in 2002. There, he spoke with individuals about the influence of social media and music within the current generation. Also, presented by Obvious Magazine, he announced that he would be touring and having pop up fan "meetups" in various cities across the United States, including that of New Orleans, Houston, Miami, Atlanta, and many more. The pop-up tour was cancelled due to conflicting schedules where Perez would be shooting #WarGames. Perez set to release his first solo music compilation in 2018, which is being produced by Timeless Music Group.

In September 2018, Perez announced that he'd be releasing an EP within the next year, giving snippets of a few songs that'd he'd been working on. On June 12, 2019, "Perfect World" was released via the Tidal music streaming service.

Advocacy
Princeton has openly supported People for the Ethical Treatment of Animals and its initiatives to end the mistreatment and abuse of animals. In a 2015 campaign for the peta2's Hottest Vegetarian Celebrities, Princeton won alongside Zendaya.

Filmography

Tours

Concert tours
Headlining
Number 1 Girl Tour (2012)
All Around The World Tour (2013)
No Parents Allowed Tour (2017) (cancelled)
Princeton Pop-Up Tour (2017) (cancelled)
Co-headlining;
Closer to My Dreams Tour (2011)
The Scream Tour (2011)

Opening act
My World Tour (2010) (North American select dates)
This Is Us Tour (2010) (North American select dates)
AOL AIM presents: (2011) (Europe—Leg 2)
Number Ones, Up Close and Personal (2010) (North American select dates)

References

1996 births
American musicians of Mexican descent
American people of Spanish descent
American male singer-songwriters
American male pop singers
American male film actors
American male television actors
21st-century American male actors
21st-century American singers
21st-century African-American male singers
Male actors from California
Singer-songwriters from California
Interscope Records artists
Epic Records artists
Musicians from Los Angeles
American male child actors
American child singers
Living people
21st-century American male singers
Hispanic and Latino American musicians
African-American songwriters
American male actors of Mexican descent